Dixmont may refer to:

 Dixmont, Maine, a town in the United States
 Dixmont, Yonne, a commune of the Yonne département, in France
 Dixmont State Hospital, a former psychiatric hospital northwest of Pittsburgh, United States